James Melven Dannaldson (born July 17, 1915, Omaha, Nebraska, died August 12, 1984, Tarzana, California (age 69)) starred in the Frank Buck film Jacaré.

Early life
Dannaldson was the son of James Jerrmiel Dannaldson and Lulu Belgium Rola Hiatt. Young James
was a shot put star at Hollywood High School in 1934, when he suffered his first animal mishap. A pet rattlesnake nipped Dannaldson's finger when he playfully stuck his thumb into the reptile's mouth. Dannaldson was not deterred, and kept a barn filled with three rattlesnakes, five king snakes, ten turtles and one hoot owl when he was a University of Southern California student. The neighbors were not pleased.

Jacaré

In Jacaré (1942) Dannaldson traveled up the Amazon to catch specimens. In the film, Dannaldson worked with jaguars and caymans, whose jaws had been wired shut. He said his only close call came when an anaconda he wrestled got a loop around his neck and almost strangled him before the natives could unwrap it. Dannaldson's most primitive adventure occurred on Marajó Island, at the mouth of the Amazon, where the movie company spent four weeks, ran out of imported food and had to subsist for five days on moldy doughnuts filled with small worms and on chickens which, Dannaldson said, seemed to be 90 per cent vulture. Producer Jules Levey incorporated a narration by  Frank Buck and music by Miklos Rozsa into the finished film.
Dannaldson came home from the Amazon with a rare eagle from Manaus, obtained as a fledgling from a native hunter. Dannaldson presented the eagle to the San Diego Zoo in 1943.

Later life
In his later years, "Jungle Jim" Dannaldson  provided animals for Hollywood films, especially reptiles, spiders, scorpions and insects for horror films. In 1977 he was to appear on The Tonight Show with a six-foot angleworm from Australia. Dannaldson was author of two books, Serpent Trails (1937) and A Trek in the Amazon Jungles (1949).

Filmography
Cannery Row (1982) (zoological specialist)
... aka John Steinbeck's Cannery Row 
Jennifer (1978) (zoological specialist) 
... aka Jennifer Power (Philippines: English title) 
... aka Jennifer the Snake Goddess 
Damnation Alley (1977) (zoological specialist) 
... aka Survival Run 
Sisters of Death (1977) (animal trainer) 
The Hills Have Eyes (1977) (snakes) 
... aka Wes Craven's The Hills Have Eyes (USA: LD title) 
Snakes (1974) (snake handler) 
... aka Fangs 
... aka Holy Wednesday
The Wild Bunch (1969) (provided ants, scorpions, and vultures)
Earth vs. the Spider (1958) (spider handler) 
... aka Earth vs. the Giant Spider 
... aka The Spider (USA: promotional title) 
The Land Unknown (1957) (lizard handler) 
The Cyclops (1957) (animal sequences) 
The Hellstrom Chronicle (1971) (special thanks) 
Jacaré (1942) (as James M. Dannaldson) .... Adventurer 
... aka Jacare, Killer of the Amazon

References

External links

 Reviews of Jacaré
 
 

American male film actors
Male actors from Omaha, Nebraska
1915 births
1984 deaths
University of Southern California alumni
Hollywood High School alumni
20th-century American male actors